is an information theorist and cryptographer, currently the director of Research Center for Information Security (RCIS), National Institute of Advanced Industrial Science and Technology (AIST) and a full professor at Chuo University. His notable work includes research in coding theory, block cipher design, and public-key cryptography.

In 1977, together with Hirakawa, he proposed a coded multilevel signal modulation scheme using several classes of binary error-correcting codes, whose symbols are combined to set up the transmission signal. This scheme is known as the Imai-Hirakawa code.

He received his Ph.D. in electrical engineering from the University of Tokyo in 1971. He was on the faculty of Yokohama National University from then until 1992, before he joined the faculty of the University of Tokyo. He has been the director of RCIS since 2005. He became a professor at Chuo University in April 2006.

He became an IEEE Fellow in 1992, and an IACR Fellow in 2007.

References

External links
 Hideki Imai's page at IIS
 Hideki Imai's page at RCIS
 ResearchMap profile

Living people
1943 births
Japanese information theorists
Modern cryptographers
University of Tokyo alumni
International Association for Cryptologic Research fellows
Academic staff of Yokohama National University
Academic staff of the University of Tokyo